Fernando Pavan (born 18 August 1932) is a Brazilian former swimmer. He competed in the men's 100 metre backstroke at the 1952 Summer Olympics.

References

External links
 

1932 births
Living people
Brazilian male backstroke swimmers
Olympic swimmers of Brazil
Swimmers at the 1952 Summer Olympics
Place of birth missing (living people)
20th-century Brazilian people